Sandro Ghenzi was an Italian film producer.

Selected filmography
 The Materassi Sisters (1944)
 The Priest's Hat (1944)
 Under the Sun of Rome (1948)
 Two Cents Worth of Hope (1952)
 Romeo and Juliet (1954)

References

Bibliography 
 Anile, Alberto. Orson Welles in Italy. Indiana University Press, 2013.

External links 
 

Year of birth unknown
Year of death unknown
Italian film producers